Spase Dilevski (born 13 May 1985) is an Australian former footballer who played as a defensive midfielder.

Club career
Dilevski started his career as a junior for Victorian lower league team Sydenham Park where he was coached by Tony Ivanov and eventually played in their seniors at a very young age. It was club policy to promote talent into the senior team that was adopted by Bill Dimovski. After showing obvious talent and out-classing others many years his senior, the Victorian Institute of Sport recruited him.

Dilevski was recruited by European clubs Tottenham Hotspur and PSV Eindhoven early in his career. After Tottenham offered him an extension on his contract, he chose to move out of England in order to get some first team experience in Australia. Dilevski joined Melbourne Victory for the duration of their participation in the 2005 Australian Club World Championship Qualifying Tournament, ultimately just the one game where they were knocked out of the tournament by Adelaide United. After a stint with Queensland Roar in Australia, he moved to Romania where he struggled for game time. In 2008, the new manager of Craiova decided to use him as a defensive midfielder, and Dilevski played well in the new position.

He returned to the A-League in March 2011 and was signed on a one-year deal with Adelaide United. Making 12 out of a possible 27 appearances for the club.

Dilevski signed for home town club Melbourne Victory on a one-year deal, It was announced on 14 June 2012.

Following his release from Melbourne Victory in mid-2013, Dilevski spent an extended period of time without a club, before signing for Armed Forces FA in the Malaysian Super League for the 2014–15 season.

In late 2015, it was confirmed that Dilevski, along with former Melbourne City FC player Jonatan Germano, would be joining National Premier Leagues Victoria side Avondale FC for the 2016 season.

International career
He was on the Australian roster for the 2003 FIFA World Youth Championship and 2005 as well as the 2004 Athens Olympics.

After having an injury ravaged 2006/7 season, Dilevski was a member of the Olyroos Squad (under the tutelage of Rob Baan) in preparation for the 2008 Beijing Olympics, but eventually missed out on a place in the final squad for the tournament.

References

External links

 Fupa profile
 Melbourne Victory profile
 Oz Football Profile

1985 births
Living people
Association football midfielders
Soccer players from Melbourne
Australian people of Macedonian descent
Australian expatriate soccer players
Australian expatriate sportspeople in England
Australian expatriate sportspeople in Germany
Olympic soccer players of Australia
Footballers at the 2004 Summer Olympics
Adelaide United FC players
PSV Eindhoven players
Rot-Weiss Essen players
Tottenham Hotspur F.C. players
Brisbane Roar FC players
FC U Craiova 1948 players
A-League Men players
Melbourne Victory FC players
Avondale FC players
Expatriate footballers in Germany
Expatriate footballers in Romania
Australian expatriate sportspeople in Romania
Australian expatriate sportspeople in Malaysia
Expatriate footballers in Malaysia
ATM FA players
Liga I players
Victorian Institute of Sport alumni
National Premier Leagues players
Australian soccer players